An oeconym, also econym, or oikonym (from , , 'house, dwelling' and , , 'name') is a specific type of toponym that designates a proper name of a house or any other residential building, and in the broader sense, the term also refers to the proper name of any inhabited settlement, like village, town or city. Within the toponomastic classification, main types of oeconyms (econyms, oikonyms) are: astionyms (proper names of towns or cities), and comonyms (proper names of villages).

Other terminology
Sometimes the term ecodomonym is used to refer specifically to a building as an inhabited place. Compare also the term mansionym to designate a historical residence (e.g., the Daniel Boone Homestead). Lay terms referring to the proper name of a house or other building include house name (either traditional or modern), farm name (referring to an entire farm), or property name (referring to a non-agricultural property).

Individuals may traditionally be referred to by their oeconyms rather than their surnames in Basque, Finnish, Norwegian, Slovene, and other languages. In these cultures the name of the property is more or less fixed and may refer to the people living there at any particular time, regardless of their actual surname or whether they recently purchased or moved to the property.

Examples of oeconyms

German
German oeconyms were often adopted as surnames. Surnames with such origins are most common in Lower Saxony and North Rhine-Westphalia.

Icelandic

Explicit reference is made to oeconyms (and their lack of correspondence with residents' names) in Njáls saga, a 13th-century Icelandic work describing events between 960 and 1020. For example:
Þar eru þrír bæir er í Mörk heita allir. Á miðbænum bjó sá maður er Björn hét og var kallaður Björn hvíti.'There are three farms in that district, all called Mörk. At the middle farm lived a man named Björn [Kaðalsson], known as Björn the White.' (chapter 148)
In comparison to oeconyms in Norwegian and Faroese, in which the share of such names based on persons' names may be as low as 4 to 5%, in Icelandic approximately 32% of oeconyms are based on a personal name. Since 1953, oeconyms have been enshrined in law, and Icelandic farms are required to have registered names approved by a special committee. As travel by ship became more common in Iceland, the number of farms that had to be distinguished grew in number, and more complex compound names were created. In compound Icelandic oeconyms, the single most common second element is -staðir 'place', although topographical suffixes (-dalr 'valley', -nes 'headland', -fell 'hill', -eyrr 'bank') form the largest group of such elements.

Norwegian

Norwegian oeconyms are based on various factors associated with a property: local geography (hills, etc.), land use, vegetation, animals, characteristic activity, folk religion, and owners' nicknames. Such names in Norway were collected in the 19-volume collection Norske Gaardnavne, published between 1897 and 1924. Typical suffixes on such names include -bø, -gaard/-gård, -heim/-um, -land, -rud/-rød, and -set. After the 1923 naming law ( or Navneloven) was passed in Norway, many rural people adopted the names of the farms where they lived as surnames. These oeconyms were retained as surnames even after they moved away to towns or emigrated. It is estimated that 70% of surnames in Norway are based on oeconyms.

The traditional oeconym system was not retained among Norwegian emigrants to the United States, even in communities where Norwegian continued to be spoken. It has been suggested that this was because of cultural differences, whereby American farms were perceived as income sources rather than traditional family seats.

Slovene

Slovene oeconyms are generally based on microtoponyms (e.g., pri Vrtaču 'sinkhole'); on names of animals (pri Ovnu 'ram'), trees (pri Gabru 'hornbeam'), and other plants (pri Čemažarju 'ramsons') associated with a property; on activities traditionally associated with a property (pri Sadjarju 'planting'); or on the name or nickname of the original property owner (pri Ančki 'Annie'). They may also refer to roles (formerly) played in the community (e.g., pri Španu 'mayor'), the property's physical position (pri Zgornjih 'upper') or age (Stara šola 'old school'), professions (pri Žnidarju 'tailor'), personal qualities (pri Bogatu 'rich'), or other noteworthy characteristics (e.g., pri Amerikanu 'immigrant returned from the United States'). The properties are generally referred to with a locative phrase (e.g., pri Gabru 'at the Gaber farm'), and the residents are referred to with the base noun (e.g., Gaber 'the man from the Gaber farm'), a derived noun (Gabrovka 'the woman from the Gaber farm'), or a preceding denominal adjective (Gabrov Jože 'Jože from the Gaber farm', Gabrova Marija 'Marija from the Gaber farm'). A well-known Slovene example is the writer Lovro Kuhar, better known by the pen name Prežihov Voranc (literally, 'Voranc from the Prežih farm'). Slovene oeconyms often appear on gravestones as plural denominal adjectives (e.g., Gabrovi 'the ones from the Gaber farm'), sometimes without the surname being given at all.

References

Sources

External links
Oluf Rygh: Norwegian Farm Names
Hišna imena na Gorenjskem (Oeconyms in Upper Carniola) 

Toponymy
Onomastics